John Paddy Carstairs (born John Keys; 11 May 1910, in London – 12 December 1970, in London) was a British film director (1933–62) and television director (1962–64), usually of light-hearted subject matter. He was also a comic novelist and painter.

Biography
The son of actor Nelson Keys, Carstairs changed his name in order to avoid the appearance of nepotism. He directed 37 films in total. He had a long association with the character of Simon Templar (the character's creator, Leslie Charteris, dedicated the 1963 book, The Saint in the Sun to Carstairs). Aside from directing the 1939 Saint film, The Saint in London, he also directed two episodes of The Saint in the 1960s, making him the only individual (other than Charteris himself) to be connected to both the Hollywood film and British series of The Saint. Carstairs directed many British comedies including many of Norman Wisdom's films.

Death 
Carstairs died of heart attack on 12 December 1970, aged 60.

Select bibliography
Honest Injun (1942)
Gremlins in the Cabbage Patch (1944)
Hadn't We the Gaiety (1945)
Kaleidoscope and a Jaundiced Eye (1946)
 Solid! Said the Earl (1948)

Selected filmography

 A Honeymoon Adventure (1931, screenwriter)
 The Water Gipsies (1932, screenwriter)
 Nine till Six (1932, screenwriter)
 The Impassive Footman (1932, screenwriter)
 Love on the Spot (1932, screenwriter)
 It's a Boy (1933, screenwriter)
 Paris Plane (1933)
 Boomerang (1934)
 Gay Love (1934)
 It's a Cop (1934, screenwriter)
 Lost in the Legion (1934, screenwriter)
 Falling in Love (1935)
 While Parents Sleep (1935, screenwriter)
 Two's Company (1936, screenwriter)
 The Captain's Table (1936, screenwriter)
 Holiday's End (1937)
 Double Exposures (1937)
 Night Ride (1937)
 Missing, Believed Married (1937)
 Incident in Shanghai (1938)
 Lassie from Lancashire (1938)
 A Yank at Oxford (1938, screenwriter)
 The Saint in London (1939)
 The Lambeth Walk (1939, screenwriter)
 All Hands (1940)
 Meet Maxwell Archer (1940)
 Now You're Talking (1940)
 The Second Mr. Bush (1940)
 Dangerous Comment (1940)
 Telefootlers (1941)
 He Found a Star (1941)
 Spare a Copper (1941)
 Dancing with Crime (1947)
 Sleeping Car to Trieste (1948)
 Fools Rush In (1949)
 The Chiltern Hundreds (1949)
 Tony Draws a Horse (1950)
 Talk of a Million (1951)
 Made in Heaven (1952)
 Treasure Hunt (1952)
 Little Big Shot (1952, screenwriter)
 Top of the Form (1953)
 Trouble in Store (1953)
 Up to His Neck (1954)
 The Crowded Day (1954, story)
 One Good Turn (1955)
 Man of the Moment (1955)
 Jumping for Joy (1956)
 Up in the World (1956)
 Just My Luck (1957)
 The Big Money (1958)
 The Square Peg (1959)
 Tommy the Toreador (1959)
 And the Same to You (1960, screenwriter)
 Sands of the Desert (1960)
 A Weekend with Lulu (1961)
 The Devil's Agent (1962)

References

External links

1910 births
1970 deaths
People educated at Alleyn Court School
Writers from London
20th-century English painters
English male painters
English autobiographers
English film directors
English film producers
German-language film directors
Royal Navy personnel of World War II
English male non-fiction writers
20th-century English male writers
20th-century English businesspeople
20th-century English male artists